"Tru" is a song by American singer-songwriter Lloyd, released on May 6, 2016, from his extended play Tru (2016). Lloyd explains his hiatus through the lyrics of the song, expressing how he lost an unborn child to an abortion and that it "left a big hole", while also detailing other family issues. The song was also included on Lloyd's fifth studio album Tru (2018).

Charts

Certifications

References

2016 singles
2016 songs
Empire Distribution singles
Lloyd (singer) songs
Song recordings produced by J.U.S.T.I.C.E. League
Songs written by Lloyd (singer)
Songs written by Erik Ortiz
Songs written by Kevin Crowe